Campbell Hill may refer to:

Elevations
 Campbell Hills (Antarctica)
 Campbell Hill, New South Wales, Australia
 Campbell Hill (Newfoundland and Labrador), Canada
 Campbell Hill (Ohio), U.S.
 Campbell Hills, Butte County, California, U.S.

Inhabited places
 Campbell Hill, Illinois, U.S.

See also
 Campbell Hall (disambiguation)